General Murray may refer to:

United Kingdom
Alexander Murray (British Army officer, died 1762) (ca. 1715–1762), British Army general
Archibald Murray (1860–1945), British Army general
Freeman Murray (1804–1885), British Army general
George Murray (British Army officer) (1772–1846), British Army major general
Lord George Murray (general) (1694-1760), Scottish Jacobite Army lieutenant general
Henry Murray (British Army officer) (1784–1860), British Army general
Horatius Murray (1903–1989), British Army general
James Murray (British Army officer, born 1721) (1721–1794), British Army general
James Murray, 1st Baron Glenlyon (1782–1837), British Army lieutenant general
James Patrick Murray (British Army officer) (1782–1834), British Army major general
James Wolfe Murray (1853–1919), British Army lieutenant general
John Murray, 2nd Earl of Dunmore (1685–1752), British Army general
Lord John Murray (1711–1787), British Army general 
Sir John Murray, 8th Baronet (c. 1768–1827), British Army general
John Irvine Murray (1826–1902), British Indian Army general
Robert Murray (British Army officer, born 1689) (1689–1738), British Army brigadier general
Thomas Murray (British Army officer, died 1764) (1698–1764), British Army lieutenant general
Thomas Murray (British Army officer, died 1816), British Army general

United States
Arthur Murray (United States Army officer) (1851–1925), U.S. Army major general
Charles I. Murray (1896–1977), U.S. Marine Corps brigadier general
James Lore Murray (1919–2004), U.S. Air Force major general
John B. Murray (general) (1822–1884), U.S. Volunteers brevet brigadier general in the American Civil War
John M. Murray (born 1960), U.S. Army general
Maxwell Murray (1885–1948), U.S. Army major general
Raymond Murray (1913–2004), U.S. Marine Corps major general
Robert Murray (physician) (1822–1913), U.S. Army brigadier general

Other
John Murray (Australian Army general) (1892–1951), Australian Army major general
Sir Joseph Murray, 3rd Baronet (1718–1802), Austrian Imperial Army general
Joseph Albert Murray (1774–1848), Austrian Imperial Army major general and son of Sir Joseph Murray, 3rd Baronet
Malcolm Murray (Swedish Army officer) (1904–1995), Swedish Army lieutenant general

See also
David Murray-Lyon (1890–1975), British Indian Army major general
Evan Murray-Macgregor (1785–1841), British Army major general
Attorney General Murray (disambiguation)